La Nube Rosa is the 13 album by the Argentine rock band Bersuit Vergarabat. The first album recorded without guitarist Oscar Righi.

Track listing

Personnel 
Alberto Verenzuela – guitar, vocals
Oscar Humberto Righi – guitar
Carlos E. Martín – drums
Rene Isel Céspedes – bass, vocals
Daniel Suárez – vocals
Juan Subirá – keyboards

References

2016 albums
Bersuit Vergarabat albums